Bianca Weiß (born 24 January 1968) is a former field hockey goalkeeper from Germany, who was a member of the Women's National Team that won the silver medal at the 1992 Summer Olympics in Barcelona, Spain.

References

External links
 
 databaseOlympics

1968 births
Living people
German female field hockey players
Female field hockey goalkeepers
Field hockey players at the 1992 Summer Olympics
Olympic field hockey players of Germany
Olympic silver medalists for Germany
Place of birth missing (living people)
Olympic medalists in field hockey
Medalists at the 1992 Summer Olympics
20th-century German women